Ellen Sheidlin ( Elena Viktorovna Lyalina; born June 30, 1994), also known as Elena Sheidlina, is a Russian photoblogger and painter.

Early life and education
Ellen was born on June 30, 1994, in Saratov. After graduating from the 9th grade of secondary school, in 2010 she entered the Saratov State College of Book Business and Information Technology. After graduation in 2013 she moved to St. Petersburg, where she began her creative career in the genre of art photography. In 2016 she graduated from the Faculty of Advertising and Public Relations of Synergy University in Moscow.

Career
Ellen creates digital photographs and videos, works in the genres of sculpture and painting. Since 2021, she has been actively using technology NFT.

Ellen herself calls the method developed by her — survirtualism, implying a mixture of digital and physical components in the works. Most often, she uses her own image to create works.

In July 2017 her first solo exhibition, “Sheidlin`s Universe” took place in St. Petersburg. In the future, Ellen's exhibitions were held in many countries of the world.

In February 2018 she was (together with Kate Adushkina, Herman Chernykh, Room Factory and Sasha Ice) nominated for a Nickelodeon Kids' Choice Awards in the category "Favorite Internet star of Russian viewers", but at the March ceremony the prize got Herman Chernykh. In April of the same year, she won the Glamour Influencers Award in the nomination #glam_artproject.

In 2021–2022 years she studied at the Accademia di Belle Arti di Firenze.

Since the beginning of her creative career, Ellen has been using social networks as the main platform for demonstrating her work. Since 2012, she has been running the main blog @sheidlina in Instagram. In 2017, she created a profile @sheidlinart dedicated to her own art works made by the method of painting.

Critics often compare her work with the work of Cindy Sherman, Marina Abramović and Andy Warhol.

Solo exhibitions
2017 — Scheidlin's Universe.Artmuza, Saint Petersburg.
2020 — Transformations. Vanilla Gallery, Tokyo.
2021 — Spinning in Mirrors. Palazzo Imperatore, Palermo.
2021 — Comprehended by Fantasy. TSH Gallery, Florence.
2022 — Materialization of Sensual ideas. Art in space gallery, Dubai.

Private life
On June 1, 2018, she announced that she had married Yevgeny Sheidlin.

On March 30, 2020, she announced about the fact that she change her name on her Twitter account.

Bibliography
 Ellen Sheidlin. Ellen in Sheidlinland. 2020. ISBN 978-4-86152-780-7.

Awards and nominations

References

Russian women painters
Russian women bloggers
1994 births
Living people
People from Saratov